Dharampal Singh is an Indian politician and a member of the 16th Legislative Assembly of India. He represents the Etmadpur constituency of Uttar Pradesh and is a member of the Bahujan Samaj Party political party.

Early life and education
Dharampal Singh was born in Mainpuri district. He attended the Dr. Bhimrao Ambedkar University and attained Doctor of Philosophy degree.

Political career
Dharampal Singh has been a MLA for two terms. He represented the Etmadpur constituency and is a member of the Bhartiya Janata Party and former member of the Bahujan Samaj Party political party.

Member of the Legislative Assembly

See also
 Etmadpur (Assembly constituency)
 Sixteenth Legislative Assembly of Uttar Pradesh
 Uttar Pradesh Legislative Assembly

References 

Bahujan Samaj Party politicians from Uttar Pradesh
Uttar Pradesh MLAs 2012–2017
People from Agra district
1963 births
Living people
Uttar Pradesh MLAs 2022–2027